Acrocercops plectospila is a moth of the family Gracillariidae. It is known from Queensland, Australia.

References

plectospila
Moths of Australia
Moths described in 1921